Raiford is a town in Union County, Florida, United States. The population was 255 at the 2010 census. As of 2018, the population recorded by the U.S. Census Bureau is 236. It was home to the original Florida State Prison and continues to be home to a total of 3 prisons.

Geography

Raiford is located at  (30.062892, –82.236999).

Demographics

As of the census of 2000, there were 187 people, 68 households, and 48 families residing in the town. The racial makeup of the town was 83.42% White, 14.97% African American, 1.07% Native American, and 0.53% from two or more races.

There were 68 households, out of which 26.5% had children under the age of 18 living with them, 57.4% were married couples living together, 7.4% had a female householder with no husband present, and 29.4% were non-families. 29.4% of all households were made up of individuals, and 14.7% had someone living alone who was 65 years of age or older.  The average household size was 2.75 and the average family size was 3.46.

In the town, the population was spread out, with 31.6% under the age of 18, 5.9% from 18 to 24, 26.7% from 25 to 44, 22.5% from 45 to 64, and 13.4% who were 65 years of age or older.  The median age was 33 years. For every 100 females, there were 83.3 males.  For every 100 females age 18 and over, there were 88.2 males.

The median income for a household in the town was $18,747 and the median income for a family was $22,000. Males had a median income of $12,708 versus $10,250 for females. The per capita income for the town was $14,684.  About 68.0% of families and 88.4% of the population were below the poverty line, including 82.00% of those under the age of 18 and 22.00% of those 65 or over making it the poorest town in the poorest county in the country.

Additional information 
Raiford is the site of a Masonic lodge, Raiford Lodge #82, under the jurisdiction of The Grand Lodge of Florida.

Raiford is also the home of Union Correctional Institution (UCI). Florida State Prison (FSP) is right across the Bradford County line, the two institutions having originally been one. UCI was the state's first prison, and was originally called Florida State Prison, the name going with the newer institution when the two were split. Both institutions house inmates in Death Row facilities. FSP conducts all executions, while most death row inmates are housed at UCI.

UCI has the most diverse population of any correctional institution in the state, with close management inmates and psych inmates as well as open population inmates. Most of the latter are age fifty and over. FSP houses the violent and criminally insane, all in solitary confinement. The penitentiary compound encompasses over fifty acres (200,000 m2) and includes a farm where much food is grown that feeds inmates.  The prison is the subject of the Lynyrd Skynyrd song "Four Walls of Raiford". This prison was shown in an episode of the 1960s television series The Fugitive.

Although there are many other correctional facilities in the state, among many persons in Florida the term "Raiford" is a metonym for incarceration in Florida State Prison, the "big house."  Only FSP is called a "prison."  All others are called correctional institutions.

Nearby are the state's training facilities for Correctional Officers (CO's), some housing for CO's, and the warden's house.

Convicted killer Ted Bundy was executed in Raiford in 1989.

References

External links
 Community of Raiford

Towns in Union County, Florida
Towns in Florida